Logan Gaffney Drake (December 26, 1899 – June 1, 1940) was a relief pitcher in Major League Baseball who played from  through  for the Cleveland Indians.

Born in Spartanburg, South Carolina, Drake began his professional baseball career with the Bradenton Growers of the Florida State League. He spent the 1919 and 1920 seasons with them; he had a batting average of .245 in 1919 and .186 in 1920. The following season, he played for the Jacksonville Scouts of the Florida State League and the Birmingham Barons of the Southern Association. The following season, he made his major league debut. Drake was one of a group of players that Indians player-manager Tris Speaker sent in partway through the game on September 21, 1922, done as an opportunity for fans to see various minor league prospects. In the game, Drake pitched three innings and allowed one earned run.

The following season, Drake played in four games for the Indians, and had a 4.15 earned run average (ERA). He spent most of the 1922 and 1923 with the Chattanooga Lookouts, rather than the major league club. In 1924, he pitched in five games for the Indians. He made the only starting appearance of his career on May 30, and allowed seven runs in under three innings to the Detroit Tigers. After one more game, he was released. After leaving the Indians, Drake spent the 1924 and 1925 seasons with the Wichita Falls Spudders. He then spent 1926 with the Albany Nuts and 1927 with the Elmira Colonels before retiring. In the 1930s, he was considered an option to become manager of the Spartanburg Spartans.

In a three-season career, Drake posted a 0–1 record with a 7.71 ERA in 10 appearances, including one start, 11 strikeouts, 16 walks, 24 hits allowed, and 18 innings, ⅔ innings of work without a save. Drake died at the age of 40 in Columbia, South Carolina.

References

External links

Retrosheet

Cleveland Indians players
Major League Baseball pitchers
Baseball players from South Carolina
Bradenton Growers players
1899 births
1940 deaths